DXHT  (102.7 FM), broadcasting as 102.7 Yes The Best, is a radio station owned and operated by Manila Broadcasting Company through its licensee Cebu Broadcasting Company. The station's studio and transmitter are located at the 4th Floor, Jose Go Huilo Bldg., Tomas Claudio St., Zamboanga City.

History
 In 1998, the station was launched as Magic 102.7 under the call letters DXRM with a Top 40 format. This is the only time Quest Broadcasting made its provincial Magic stations as other stations carried the Killerbee name.
 On January 1, 1999, Manila Broadcasting Company acquired the station while the next year the frequency moved to 95.5 MHz. As a result, it was rebranded as 102.7 Hot FM and switched to a mass-based format.
 In 2005, DXRM changed its call letters to DXHT.
 In 2011, it was ranked #1 in the city, based on the Nielsen Media Research Survey held in that year.
 On February 24, 2014, the station, along with the O&O Hot FM stations was rebranded as Yes FM.
 On May 1, 2017, the station started carrying the Yes The Best branding.

References

External links
Yes The Best Zamboanga FB Page
Yes The Best Zamboanga Website

Radio stations established in 1998
Radio stations in Zamboanga City